Negligence is a concept in the law of tort.

Negligence may also refer to:
Negligence (band), a Slovenian thrash metal band

See also 
Negligence per se,  a legal doctrine whereby an act is considered negligent because it violates a statute or regulation
Negligence in employment
Calculus of negligence
Comparative negligence
Contributory negligence
Criminal negligence
Excusable negligence
Gross negligence
Neglect
Professional negligence in English Law